The 1999 Nigerian Senate election in Rivers State was held on February 20, 1999, to elect members of the Nigerian Senate to represent Rivers State. Ibiapuye Martyns-Yellowe representing Rivers West, Adawari Pepple representing Rivers South-East and John Azuta-Mbata representing Rivers East all won on the platform of the Peoples Democratic Party.

Overview

Summary

Results

Rivers West 
The election was won by Ibiapuye Martyns-Yellowe of the Peoples Democratic Party.

Rivers South-East 
The election was won by Adawari Pepple of the Peoples Democratic Party.

Rivers East 
The election was won by John Azuta-Mbata of the Peoples Democratic Party.

References 

Riv
Riv
Rivers State Senate elections